Moatasem Salem Bakr Hussein (born 2 September 1980) is an Egyptian retired footballer. He was also a member of Egypt national football team.
His kids are mazen moatasem and malek moatasem

Club career
Salem signed a four-year contract extension with Ismaily in June 2008, which kept him tied to the club until June 2012. However, in December 2010 Ismaily agreed to sell Salem to the highest bidder to solve their financial crisis and Zamalek SC showed their interest in the player.

References

External links
 
 Moatasem Salem at Footballdatabase

1980 births
Living people
Egyptian footballers
Association football defenders
Egypt international footballers
2010 Africa Cup of Nations players
Africa Cup of Nations-winning players